Vedran Golec (born 30 June 1989 in Bjelovar, Croatia) is a Croatian taekwondo fighter. He won silver in the men's +87 kg division at the 2014 European Taekwondo Championships and bronze in the men's +80 kg division at the 2015 European Games.
He is the most successful Croatian Taekwondo Fighter in category over 80 kg (11 times Croatian Champion).

References

1989 births
Croatian male taekwondo practitioners
Living people
Taekwondo practitioners at the 2015 European Games
European Games medalists in taekwondo
European Games bronze medalists for Croatia
European Taekwondo Championships medalists
21st-century Croatian people